The First of May Group was an anarchist anti-Franco resistance movement which took militant action against Francoist Spain.  They were formed in 1966 by Spanish exiles including Iberian Federation of Libertarian Youth (FIJL) members in France, dissatisfied with what they perceived as the quietism of other opposition groups.  Actions attributed to the group include the kidnapping of diplomat and priest Monsignor Marcos Ussia, occupation of the Vatican Embassy an in 1966 and the machine-gunning of the Spanish embassy in London. A man claiming to speak for the group stated that they were behind the March 1974 bombing of the Spanish Cultural Institute in Dublin.  In 1980 the book Towards a citizens militia: anarchist alternatives to NATO and the Warsaw pact was written by 'International Revolutionary Solidarity Movement (First of May Group) and published by Cienfuegos Press.

In Greece a group of a similar name but without any relation also appeared in 1989, mostly known for killing Supreme Court Prosecutor Anastasios Vernardos.

Actions

Kidnapping of Marcos Ussia 
Ussia was taken captive as he was driving to his home in the Rome suburbs by "three young anarchists" wearing masks who blocked a narrow road with a car and one of their bodies before taking him in their car to a house in which he was kept for the duration of his confinement. Ussia at a subsequent press conference explained his kidnappers motives, saying they had kidnapped him in order to persuade Pope Paul to intervene in favour  the release of all political prisoners in Spain. Luis Andrés Edo was later formally accused of being complicit in the kidnapping after being arrested for Operation Durruti.

Operation Durruti 
On 24 October 1966 five members of First of May Group including Luis Andrés Edo were arrested in Madrid by the Brigada Político-Social, the Francoist secret police, and charged with preparing acts of terrorism after being infiltrated by a police informant.  The group had planned to kidnap US Rear Admiral Norman Campbell Gillette, Jr., the Commander of US forces in Spain. The action was referred to as 'Operation Durruti' named after the famous Spanish Anarchist Buenaventura Durruti.  Octavio Alberola later flew to New York personally to announce the failure of Operation Durruti in a press conference in which he confirmed the plan to kidnap Rear Admiral Gillette.

See also 
Anarchism in Spain
The Angry Brigade
Terrorism in Spain
Spanish Maquis
Stuart Christie

References

Bibliography
 
 

History of anarchism
Defunct anarchist militant groups
Anarchist organisations in Spain
Anti-fascist organisations in Spain
Anti-Francoism
Left-wing militant groups in Spain
Defunct anarchist organizations in Europe
1966 establishments in Spain
1974 disestablishments in Spain